Výtopna is a restaurant with model train service, where trainsets bring beverages to every customer table. Výtopna is a franchise of five restaurants and coffeehouses in larger cities of the Czech Republic. There is one restaurant each in Prague and Orlová and one coffeehouse in Ostrava. The trademark is owned by Petr Fridrich.

History 
The first restaurant with model train service was founded in Brno, Czech Republic in 2009. From the very beginning the restaurant was conceived as a franchise project, in Bohemia, Moravia and Silesia - regions of the Czech Republic. After securing the necessary protection of Know-how it was created Industrial design. Branch in Brno on Starobrněnská street has been closed down since 27.8.2018.

Principle 
Customers are served by model trains that deliver beverages to them. Trains (locomotive plus open wagon or wagons) arrive bearing customers' orders, and customers unload their own drinks, and reload the used glasses. Trains are dispatched to the tables by staff. Individual trains are digitally controlled and they make realistic sounds of genuine trains.

Model train technical specifications 
 Size / design:scale 1:22,5 / G scale
 Locomotive size: 24–47 inch
 Top speed: 12,4 mph
 Durability: 310 000–434 000 model Miles
 Locomotive equipment: realistic sound, lights, two engines

See also 
 Gastronomy
 Rail transport modelling

References

External links 
Výtopna's Czech Site
prague-stay article
mydestination article
Miniature Trains Deliver Drinks & Desserts in Restaurant

Restaurants in Prague
Restaurants established in 2009
2009 establishments in the Czech Republic
21st-century architecture in the Czech Republic